Bryony Marks is an Australian composer of film scores and theatre music, for which she has won several awards and been nominated for many others. Among her television credits is Please Like Me and Barracuda, and films include Berlin Syndrome and 2040. She has also composed the music for many of the films directed by her husband, Matthew Saville.

Early life and education
Marks' parents own(ed) a vineyard in Gembrook, in the Dandenongs, near Melbourne in Victoria. She was born in around 1971.

She completed a Postgraduate Diploma in Music Composition for Film and Television at the Melbourne Conservatorium of Music, part of University of Melbourne, achieving first class honours. In 2001 she attended the inaugural program for composers at the Australian National Academy of Music, where she studied under Simon Bainbridge and Karen Tanaka.

She first met her future husband, filmmaker Matt Saville, at the Victorian College of the Arts.

Career
Marks composed music for several stage productions in the 1990s, and in 2004 participated in MODART05, an event hosted by Song Company and the Australian Music Centre.

In September 2007, she composed the music for Saville's opera, Crossing Live. Staged at the Malthouse Theatre in Melbourne, the work won  Victorian Green Room Awards in New Operatic Work and Best New Australian Opera Work. 

Marks has written the scores for several films and TV series directed by Saville, including his debut feature film, Noise (2007);  Felony (2013); Please Like Me; and his 2007 documentary The King: The Story of Graham Kennedy, about Australian entertainer Graham Kennedy. She composed the music for the Chris Lilley series We Can Be Heroes (2005), Summer Heights High (2007), and Angry Boys.

She teamed up with the creator of Please like me, Josh Thomas, for the second time, to create the music for his TV series made in the US, Everything's Gonna Be Okay, in 2020–2021.
In 2021 Marks released LOCKDOWN Birdsong, featuring Kristian Chong and Erica Kennedy, which reflected on the first Melbourne COVID-19 lockdown.

Other film and TV credits include:
Damon Gameau's 2040
Tori Garrett's 2017 film Don’t Tell
Cate Shortland's Berlin Syndrome
Lambs of God
the ABC miniseries Barracuda, based on the book by Christos Tsiolkas
 The King: The Story of Graham Kennedy, a 2007 documentary directed by Saville

Marks has said:

Awards
2017: Film Critics Circle of Australia Awards, Best Original Score, for Berlin Syndrome
2019: 2019 AACTA Awards, Best Original Score in Television, for  Lambs of God
2019: AACTA Awards, Best Original Score in a Documentary, for 2040

Personal life
Marks married Australian film director Matthew Saville in 2003 at her parents' vineyard, and they have two sons.

References

Further reading

External links

Bryony Marks on AusStage

Australian women composers
Australian film score composers
21st-century women composers
20th-century women composers
Women television composers
Australian musical theatre composers
Year of birth missing (living people)
Living people